Val-de-Lambronne is a commune in the Aude department of southern France. The municipality was established on 1 January 2016 by merger of the former communes of Caudeval and Gueytes-et-Labastide.

See also 
Communes of the Aude department

References 

Communes of Aude

Communes nouvelles of Aude
Populated places established in 2016
2016 establishments in France